Daisuke Caumanday Sato (born September 20, 1994) is a Filipino professional footballer who plays as a left-back for Liga 1 club Persib Bandung and the Philippines national team.

Early life
Sato was born in Davao City, Philippines to a Filipino mother and a Japanese father. He was a member of the youth team of the Urawa Red Diamonds.

Club career

Global announced on March 7, 2014, that it had signed Daisuke Sato.

Politehnica Iași
In June 2016, he went on trial with Romanian Liga I side Politehnica Iași.  He also featured in five pre-season training matches where he started one match and came on as a substitute on the other four.  The team won one and drew four.  He was able to impress coach Nicolò Napoli and was signed permanently on a four-year contract.

On 17 September 2016, Sato played the whole match against Dinamo Bucuresti as CSM Politehnica Iași lost 3–1, thus becoming the first Filipino-born to play in Romania.

Horsens
In late June 2017, it was announced that Sato had signed for Danish Super League outfit Horsens on a three-year deal. However on 6 December 2017,
it was announced that Sato terminated his contract with Horsens. He played a total of four matches for the club.

Sepsi OSK
After his stint in Denmark, Daisuke Sato returned to Romania to play in Liga I. On January 5, 2018, it was reported that Sato has signed in with Sepsi OSK. Sato left the club in May 2019. Sato had 44 appearances for Sepsi over two seasons.

Muangthong United
Thai League side Muangthong United in June 2019 announced that they have signed Sato.

Suphanburi
On 7 July 2021, after Sato's contract with Muangthong United has ended. He decided to join another Thai League side Suphanburi on a free transfer.

Persib Bandung
On 11 June 2022, Sato joined a Liga 1 team Persib Bandung. He made his league debut on 24 July 2022 in a match against Bhayangkara at the Wibawa Mukti Stadium, Cikarang.

International career
Sato made his international debut in a friendly match against Nepal in April 2014 and assisted a goal from his club mate. The footballer was part of the Philippine squad that played at the 2014 AFC Challenge Cup, where the team finished in second place.

Sato scored his first International goal in a 2–3 loss against Myanmar during the 2014 Philippine Peace Cup. He scored his second goal for his country with a long range strike in an exhibition match against Cambodia.

Career statistics

Club

Notes

International goals
Scores and results list the Philippines' goal tally first.

Honours

Philippines
AFC Challenge Cup runner-up: 2014

References

External links
 
 
 
 
 

1994 births
Living people
Japanese people of Filipino descent
Filipino people of Japanese descent
Sportspeople from Davao City
Citizens of the Philippines through descent
Japanese footballers
Filipino footballers
Philippines international footballers
Association football fullbacks
Global Makati F.C. players
FC Politehnica Iași (2010) players
AC Horsens players
Sepsi OSK Sfântu Gheorghe players
Daisuke Sato
Daisuke Sato
Daisuke Sato
Persib Bandung players
Philippines Football League players 
Liga I players
Danish Superliga players
Daisuke Sato
Liga 1 (Indonesia) players
Filipino expatriate footballers
Expatriate footballers in Romania
Filipino expatriate sportspeople in Romania
Expatriate men's footballers in Denmark
Filipino expatriate sportspeople in Denmark
Expatriate footballers in Thailand
Filipino expatriate sportspeople in Thailand
Expatriate footballers in Indonesia
Filipino expatriate sportspeople in Indonesia
2019 AFC Asian Cup players